White's Tavern (also known as the Daniel White Tavern) is a historic former tavern on United States Route 6 in Andover, Connecticut.  Built in 1773, it is a well-preserved example of colonial architecture, notable for hosting French Army officers in the American Revolutionary War.  Now a private residence, the building was listed on the National Register of Historic Places in 1991.

Description and history
The former White's Tavern is located on the east side of US Route 6, south of its junction with Hendee Road.  The building is set between US 6 and Hutchinson Road, an 18th-century alignment of a main road through the area, and actually faces east toward that road, despite now having an address on US 6.  It is a large -story wood-framed structure, five bays wide with two interior chimneys.  The windows are evenly spaced within a narrower area than the full width of the building, rather than being uniformly spaced across the main facade.  The main entrance is framed by simple moulding and topped by a transom window. The building has a central hall plan, with original wide floor boards, plasterwork, and fireplaces.  Some of the upstairs rooms have swinging walls mounted on strap hinges that can be moved to create a large ballroom.

The tavern was built in 1773 by Daniel White, and was in use as a tavern when the French Army marched through the area in 1781, camping just to its north.  The Marquis de Chastellux was among the French officers who stayed here.  The building is also architecturally significant as a well-preserved 18th century tavern house.

See also
National Register of Historic Places listings in Tolland County, Connecticut
List of historic sites preserved along Rochambeau's route

References

Andover, Connecticut
Hotel buildings on the National Register of Historic Places in Connecticut
Houses completed in 1773
Taverns in Connecticut
Houses in Tolland County, Connecticut
Historic places on the Washington–Rochambeau Revolutionary Route
National Register of Historic Places in Tolland County, Connecticut
Drinking establishments on the National Register of Historic Places in Connecticut
1773 establishments in Connecticut